Matthew Gee (November 25, 1925 in Houston, Texas – July 18, 1979 in New York City) was an American bebop trombonist and part-time actor.

Gee played trumpet and baritone as a child, and took up the trombone at age 11. After studying at Alabama State University, he played with Coleman Hawkins before doing a stint in the Army. Following this, he played with Dizzy Gillespie (1946–1949), Joe Morris, Gene Ammons and Sonny Stitt (1950), Count Basie (1951), Illinois Jacquet (1952–1954), Lou Donaldson (1954), Sarah Vaughan (1956), and Gillespie again in 1957. In 1956 he released his only record as a bandleader on Riverside Records. From 1959 to 1963 he played on and off with the Duke Ellington Orchestra. Later in the 1960s, he played in small groups with Paul Quinichette and Brooks Kerr, as well as in big bands with Sonny Stitt and Johnny Griffin.

Discography

As leader
 Jazz by Gee (Riverside, 1956) 
 Soul Groove (Atlantic, 1963) - with Johnny Griffin

As sideman
With Gene Ammons
Soulful Saxophone (Chess, 1948-50 [1959])
Jug and Sonny (Chess, 1948–51, [1960])
The Gene Ammons Story: The 78 Era (Prestige, 1950–55)
With Count Basie
Basie in London (Verve, 1956)
With Ray Bryant
Dancing the Big Twist (Columbia, 1961)
With Lou Donaldson
Quartet/Quintet/Sextet (Blue Note, 1952–54)
With Duke Ellington
Blues in Orbit (Columbia, 1958–59)
Swinging Suites by Edward E. and Edward G. (1960)
With Dizzy Gillespie
Jazz Recital (Norgran, 1955)
With Tony Graye
Oh, Gee! (Zim, 1975)
With Johnny Griffin
The Big Soul-Band (Prestige, 1960)
With Coleman Hawkins
Body And Soul Revisited (GRP, 1951–58)
With Erskine Hawkins
1946-1947 (Classics)
With Illinois Jacquet
Groovin' with Jacquet (Clef, 1951-53 [1956])
The Kid and the Brute (Clef, 1955)
The Soul Explosion (Prestige, 1969)
With Sonny Stitt
Stitt's Bits (Prestige, 1950 [1958])
Kaleidoscope (Prestige, 1950 [1957])
Sonny Stitt & the Top Brass (Atlantic, 1962)

References

 Richard Cook & Morton, Brian: The Penguin Guide To Jazz on CD'', 6th Edition, London, Penguin, 2002 .
 Scott Yanow, [ Matthew Gee] at Allmusic.com

American jazz trombonists
Male trombonists
Musicians from Houston
Riverside Records artists
1925 births
1979 deaths
20th-century American musicians
20th-century trombonists
Jazz musicians from Texas
20th-century American male musicians
American male jazz musicians